Mojo Ruiz de Luzuriaga, known professionally as Mo'Ju and previously as Mojo Juju, is an ARIA Award-nominated Australian musician, best known for their 2018 album Native Tongue and the lead single of the same title. The single won the Best Independent Single category in the 2019 AIR Awards. They play guitar and piano, write songs and sing, and have created music in a number of genres.

Mo'Ju has toured with international performers and their music has been featured in a number of television shows. Their identity is a matter of pride and they have spoken publicly and through their music about being Wiradjuri, Filipino and queer.

Early life  
Mojo Ruiz de Luzuriaga was born in regional New South Wales. Their father is Filipino, from Bacolod City, Negros and their mother is mixed race, of Wiradjuri and European heritage. Their family moved around the region when they were a young child due to their Father's work, but their grandparents lived in Dubbo where they attended high school. They have spoken openly about feeling like an outsider through their childhood and how this laid the grounds for their exploration of cultural identity in their work. Their father speaks, but did not teach them, Spanish, Ilonggo or Tagalog language.

Mojo grew up around music with a number of musicians in their mother's family. They had a few piano lessons before starting to play the guitar aged eight.

In a 2019 interview with SBS TV's The Feed Mo'ju said: "Traditions are really important and family histories give you an insight into your own identity. Songwriting is a huge part of keeping those oral traditions alive."

Career

Mo'ju has toured with international performers Tony Joe White, Rufus Wainwright, Aloe Blacc and Australian artists including Hilltop Hoods, Paul Kelly and Kira Puru.

Mo'ju has performed live shows with artists such as Hiatus Kaiyote, Ella Hooper, Kaiit, Sampa The Great and Emma Donovan.

Their music has been featured in a number of television shows including Underbelly: Razor, Underbelly: Squizzy, Roadtrip Nation  and Total Control.

Mo'ju was interviewed in the documentary film Her Sound, Her Story, along with a large number of high profile women in the Australian music industry.

2006–2010: Mojo Juju & The Snake Oil Merchants

Between 2006 and 2010, Mojo fronted a band called Mojo Juju & The Snake Oil Merchants. The band released two independent albums, Mojo Juju & The Snake Oil Merchants (2007) and Sellin' You Salvation (2009) before splitting.

A compilation of earlier material, Mojo Juju & The Snake Oil Merchants – Anthology, was released in 2015 on European label Off-Label Records. to coincide with the release of German film Bestefreunde, whose soundtrack was composed entirely of songs from the band's back catalogue.

2012–2015: Going solo
In January 2012, Ruiz de Luzuriaga released their eponymous (performing as Mojo Juju at the time) debut solo album on ABC Music. It featured the singles "Horse Named Regret" and "Must Be Desire", and was in a blues style, featuring a lot of guitar.

In April 2015, they released their second solo studio album Seeing Red/Feeling Blue, an album with more pop elements than the first, but touching on a range of genres. They used the piano to write it, and, wanting to develop a new sound, collaborated with their friend Ptero Stylus, who had been working with hip hop duo Diafrix, as well as musicians from soul acts the Putbacks and the Cactus Channel. It features the singles "A Heart Is Not a Yo-Yo" and "They Come and They Go".

On 30 May 2015 Juju performed at Vivid Live with the Melbourne Ska Orchestra at the Sydney Opera House.

2018-2019: Native Tongue
In August 2018, Mo'ju's third studio album Native Tongue was released, after four years in the making. The album explored their family history, identity and race politics.

They have spoken of the highly personal nature of the album and the single, saying they were about “allowing yourself to own all those different parts of who you are”. Responding to criticism by right-wing commentator Andrew Bolt, who described the title track of the album as a complaint, Mo'ju said that it was in fact an “expression of some complex emotions, such as grief for a loss of culture and Indigenous languages and other impacts of assimilation, colonisation and the white-washing of non-western cultures. This is not a song of self-pity, [but rather]...a song of self-empowerment”.

The Pasefika Vitoria Choir feature on the title track, which is produced by Malaysian-Australian hip hop artist Joelistics; other artists on the album include Lay the Mystic, Mirrah, and Joshua Tavares. Mo'ju's brother, Steve "T-Bone" Ruiz de Luzuriaga, and Melbourne-based producer and musician Yeo, were the backing musicians on the track.

Mo'ju said that performing this new material "reignited their passion and purpose for music", but has also spoken out about the way women of colour and other diverse artists have been subject to tokenism in the industry.

2019-2020: Ghost Town
Chicago Tribune listed Mo'ju (then Mojo Juju) as one of the top 12 acts to showcase at SXSW in 2019.

In May 2019 Mo'ju appeared as a featured artist on the single "Black Child" by Birdz.

In June 2019 Mo'ju joined A.B. Original as a guest vocalist for their live performance on the SummerStage in Central Park in New York.

In November 2019, Mo'ju released the collaborative EP Ghost Town with Joelistics.

2021: O.K.
On 17 September 2021, Mo'ju released "Wave", the lead single from the forthcoming EP OK, scheduled for released in November 2021. In a statement Mo'ju  said "These are sad songs but they were also part of a healing process. Music is pretty special like that and I am extremely grateful to have the tools to express myself and process my feelings through a creative practice."

2022-present: Oro, Plata, Mata
In November 2022, Mo'ju released "Change Has to Come", the lead single from their fourth studio album, scheduled for released in March 2023. Oro, Plata, Mata was announced in January, alongside single "Money".

Discography

Albums

Extended Plays

Singles

As lead artist

Awards and nominations

AIR Awards
The annual AIR Awards celebrate the success of Australian independent musicians.

|-
| AIR Awards of 2019
| "Native Tongue"
| Best Independent Single
| 
|-

APRA Awards
The APRA Awards are presented annually from 1982 by the Australasian Performing Right Association (APRA), "honouring composers and songwriters".

! 
|-
| rowspan="2"| 2019
| rowspan="2"| "Native Tongue" (Mojo Juju / Joel Ma / Rita Seumanuta)
| Urban Work of the Year
| 
| 
|-
| Song of the Year
| 
| 
|-
|}

ARIA Music Awards
The ARIA Music Awards is an annual award ceremony event celebrating the Australian music industry. Mojo Juju has been nominated for three awards.

! 
|-
| rowspan="3"| 2018
| rowspan="2"| Mojo Juju - Native Tongue
| Best Urban Release
| 
|
|-
| Breakthrough Artist
| 
|
|-
| "Native Tongue" (directed by Claudia Sangiorgi Dalimore)
| Best Video
| 
|   
|-

Australian Women in Music Awards
The Australian Women in Music Awards is an annual event that celebrates outstanding women in the Australian Music Industry who have made significant and lasting contributions in their chosen field. They commenced in 2018.

|-
| 2019
| Mojo Juju
| Songwriter Award
|

J Awards
The J Awards are an annual series of Australian music awards that were established by the Australian Broadcasting Corporation's youth-focused radio station Triple J. They commenced in 2005.

|-
| rowspan="2"| J Awards of 2018
| herself
| Double J Artist of the Year
| 
|-
| "Native Tongue"
| Australian Video of the Year
|

Music Victoria Awards
The Music Victoria Awards (previously known as The Age EG Awards and The Age Music Victoria Awards) are an annual awards night celebrating Victorian music. They commenced in 2006.

! 
|-
| rowspan="2"| 2015
| Mo'Ju
| Best Female Artist
| 
| rowspan="7"| 
|-
| Seeing Red / Feeling Blue
| Best Soul, Funk, R'n'B and Gospel Album
| 
|-
| rowspan="4"| 2018
| rowspan="3"| Mo'Ju
| Best Female Musician
| 
|-
| Best Solo Artist
| 
|-
| Best Global Act
| 
|-
| "Native Tongue"
| Best Song
| 
|-
| 2020
| Joelistics for Mo'Ju & Joelistics Ghost Town (EP)
| Best Producer
| 
|-
|rowspan="2"| 2022
|rowspan="2"| Mo'Ju
| Best Solo Artist
| 
| 
|-
| Soul, Funk, RNB & Gospel Work
| 
| 
|-

National Dreamtime Awards
The National Dreamtime Awards are an annual celebration of Australian Aboriginal and Torres Strait Islander achievement in sport, arts, academia and community. Mojo Juju won the Female Music Artist Award in 2018.

|-
| 2018
| Mojo Juju
| Female Music Artist
| 
|-

National Indigenous Music Awards
The National Indigenous Music Awards is an annual awards ceremony that recognises the achievements of Indigenous Australians in music. Mojo Juju have won two awards

! 
|-
| rowspan="4"| 2019
| Mojo Juju
| Artist of the Year
| 
| rowspan="4"| 
|-
| Native Tongue
| Album of the Year
| 
|-
| rowspan="2"| "Native Tongue"
| Song of the Year
| 
|-
| Film clip of the Year
| 
|-
| rowspan="1"| 2022
| "Sometime"
| Song of the Year
| 
| 
|-

National Live Music Awards
The National Live Music Awards (NLMAs) are a broad recognition of Australia's diverse live industry, celebrating the success of the Australian live scene. The awards commenced in 2016.

|-
| National Live Music Awards of 2016
| Mojo Juju 
| Live R&B or Soul Act of the Year
| 
|-
| National Live Music Awards of 2017
| Mojo Juju 
| Live R&B or Soul Act of the Year
| 
|-
| rowspan="2" | National Live Music Awards of 2018
| rowspan="2" | Mojo Juju 
| Live R&B or Soul Act of the Year
| 
|-
| Best Live Act of the Year - People's Choice
| 
|-
| rowspan="3" | National Live Music Awards of 2019
| rowspan="3" | Mojo Juju 
| Live Act of the Year
| 
|-
| Live R&B or Soul Act of the Year
| 
|-
| Victorian Live Act of the Year
| 
|-

References

Australian singer-songwriters
1983 births
Living people
21st-century Australian singers